The 1982 United States Senate election in Vermont took place on November 2, 1982. Incumbent Republican Robert Stafford successfully ran for re-election to another term in the United States Senate, defeating Democratic candidate James A. Guest. This election marks the last time a Democrat won any counties in a race for Vermont's Class 1 US Senate seat, as well as the last time the winner of the seat did not win every county in the state.

Republican primary

Results

Democratic primary

Results

General election

Results

See also 
 1982 United States Senate elections

References 

Vermont
1982
United States Senate